Guy A. Benson (April 18, 1876 – May 3, 1958) was a member of the Wisconsin State Assembly.

Biography
Benson was born on April 18, 1876, in Jordan, Wisconsin. He attended the University of Wisconsin. He married Anna Holtz in 1903. He died in Phoenix, Arizona in 1958 and was buried in Spooner, Wisconsin.

Career
Benson was a member of the Assembly from 1939 to 1948. Additionally, he was a member of the Washburn County, Wisconsin Board, President of the Spooner, Wisconsin School Board, a Spooner alderman and Mayor of Spooner. He was a Republican.

References

People from Jordan, Wisconsin
People from Spooner, Wisconsin
Republican Party members of the Wisconsin State Assembly
Mayors of places in Wisconsin
Wisconsin city council members
School board members in Wisconsin
University of Wisconsin–Madison alumni
1876 births
1958 deaths